Sara Levy Sellarés (born 23 May 1994) is a Spanish competitor in synchronized swimming.

She won two silver medals at the 2013 World Aquatics Championships. She also won a silver and a bronze at the 2014 European Aquatics Championships.

Notes

References

External links 
 
 

1994 births
Living people
Spanish synchronized swimmers
World Aquatics Championships medalists in synchronised swimming
Synchronized swimmers at the 2013 World Aquatics Championships
Synchronized swimmers at the 2015 World Aquatics Championships
European Aquatics Championships medalists in synchronised swimming